is a railway station in the city of Kōriyama, Fukushima, Japan operated by East Japan Railway Company (JR East).

Lines

Station layout
The station has a one side platform serving a single bi-directional track. The station formerly had two opposed side platforms, but one of the platforms is no longer in use.

History
Iwaki-Moriyama Station opened on May 10, 1929. The station was absorbed into the JR East network upon the privatization of the Japanese National Railways (JNR) on April 1, 1987.

Surrounding area

Moriyama Post Office
Moriyama Onsen

See also
 List of Railway Stations in Japan

External links

   

Stations of East Japan Railway Company
Railway stations in Fukushima Prefecture
Suigun Line
Railway stations in Japan opened in 1929
Kōriyama